Trimbelten is a 2013 German short drama / thriller film, directed by German film director Sebastian Kühn. The film participated in various international film festivals.

Plot
After years in his self-imposed exile, the broken ex-cop Trimbelten hears, that Karl Münch, the person who is responsible for his daughter's death, was released from jail. Trimbelten embarks on his mission to take revenge, but on his way he bumps into the rebellious girl Stina. He picks up the hitchhiker. Trimbelten's grief and obsession with revenge is momentarily relieved by Stina's helpless vulnerability.

Cast
Axel Siefer as Trimbelten
Johanna Reinders as Stina
Stefan Lampadius as Karl Münch

Awards 
2013: Nominated for Festival Award in the category Best Student Film at the Crossroads Film Festival in Mississippi.
2013: Nominated for Best Student Film in the George Sidney independent film competition at the San Luis Obispo International Film Festival in San Luis Obispo, California.

References

External links 
 

2013 films
2010s German-language films
2013 short films
German drama short films
2010s German films